Singeetam Srinivasa Rao (born 21 September 1931), commonly known as Singeetam, is an Indian film director, screenwriter, producer, composer, and actor. He is widely regarded as one of the most versatile directors of India. He is credited with having revolutionised the South Indian cinema with experimental films. He has directed about sixty films in Telugu, Kannada, Tamil, Hindi, and English languages across multiple genres. He has garnered two National Film Awards, five Nandi Awards, three Karnataka State Film Awards, and three Filmfare Awards South. In 2011, Rao was honored with Life Achievement Award from the Film Federation of India.

Singeetam worked as an assistant to noted director K. V. Reddy from 1955 to 1968 in films like Mayabazar (1957), Jagadeka Veeruni Katha (1961). He made his directorial debut with the Telugu film Neethi Nijayithi (1972). He then directed social problem films like Dikkatra Parvathi (1974), which won the National Film Award for Best Feature Film in Tamil, and Tharam Marindi (1977), which won Nandi Award for Best Feature Film.

He went on to direct notable films like Panthulamma (1978), Mayuri (1985), Anand (1986), Pushpaka Vimana (1987), Aditya 369 (1991), Brundavanam (1992), Magalir Mattum (1994), Bhairava Dweepam (1994), Madam (1994), and Son of Aladdin (2003). Mayuri won a record 14 Nandi Awards, and the dialogue-less film, Pushpaka Vimana received the National Film Award for Best Popular Film. Aditya 369 and Bhairava Dweepam are considered landmark films in science fiction and fantasy genres respectively in Telugu cinema.

He is particularly noted for his collaboration with two actors  Dr. Rajkumar and Kamal Haasan  which resulted in commercially successful and critically acclaimed films. With Kamal Haasan, he collaborated on Sommokadidhi Sokokadidihi (1979), Raja Paarvai / Amavasya Chandrudu (1981), Pushpaka Vimana (1987), Apoorva Sagodharargal (1990) and Michael Madana Kama Rajan (1990) among others. With Rajkumar, he directed films like Haalu Jenu (1982), Chalisuva Modagalu (1982), Eradu Nakshatragalu (1983), and Bhagyada Lakshmi Baramma (1986).

Early life 
Singeetam Srinivasa Rao was born on 21 September 1931 into a Telugu-speaking family in Udayagiri of Nellore district in present-day Andhra Pradesh. His father Ramachandra Rao was a headmaster and his mother Sakunthala Bai was a violinist. As a school student, he showed glimpses of talent both in plays and music. He graduated with a Physics Degree from Presidency College, Chennai. In college, he honed his skills in plays such as Windows under Harindranath Chattopadhyay.

Career

Early career 
After graduation his ambition was to get into films. As his attempts to meet the director K. V. Reddy failed, he took up the job of a teacher in Sullurupeta. But he continued writing and wrote two experimental award-winning plays Bhrama and Anthyaghattam. He also wrote Chitrarjuna, a musical play adopted from Tagore's Chitra - Prince of the Dark Chamber. It was translated into English by Scottish dramatist Tom Buchan for an American television channel. He also worked as a journalist at the time writing for Telugu Swatantra.

Telugu cinema 
He continued his efforts to meet his favourite director K. V. Reddy and in 1954 he was finally able to meet him. K. V. Reddy gave him a copy of The Monkey's Paw and asked him to write a script based on it. Srinivasa Rao wrote the script along with dialogues in three months. K. V. Reddy was impressed and took him as an apprentice. He later graduated as an associate director under K. V. Reddy and worked with him for all his films from Donga Ramudu (1955) until Uma Chandi Gowri Sankarula Katha (1968) including Mayabazar (1957), Jagadeka Veeruni Katha (1961), Sri Krishnarjuna Yuddham (1963).

In 1972, Srinivasa Rao ventured into film direction with Neethi Nijayithi, an offbeat Telugu film. The film won critical acclaim but was not commercially successful. He then directed the social problem film Tharam Marindi (1977) which won the Nandi Award for Best Feature Film.

He made other successful Telugu films like Zamindaru gari Ammayi (1975), America Ammayi (1976), Panthulamma (1978), Sommokadidhi Sokokadidhi (1979), Mayuri (1985), Aditya 369 (1991), Brundavanam (1992), Bhairava Dweepam (1994), Madam (1994). Mayuri won a record 14 Nandi Awards including the Nandi Award for Best Feature Film. Srinivasa Rao won the Nandi Award for Best Screenplay Writer for Brundavanam and the Nandi Award for Best Director for Bhairava Dweepam. Aditya 369 and Bhairava Dweepam are considered classic films in science fiction and fantasy genres respectively in Telugu cinema.

Srinivasa Rao collaborated with Balakrishna in three films  the science fiction film Aditya 369, fantasy film Bhairava Dweepam, and the mythological film Sri Krishnarjuna Vijayam (1996). He worked with Rajendra Prasad in two films  Brundavanam and Madam. Both were commercially successful.

He made over half of his films in Telugu. He directed nearly 30 Telugu films across genres. His most recent film was Welcome Obama (2013). The story deals with commercial surrogacy in India where women are used as surrogates by foreigners and tells the story of one such surrogate mother who bears a foreigner's child.

He is also roped in as a mentor for the upcoming Telugu science fiction film Project K. Made at an estimated budget of ₹500 crore, it is one of the most expensive Indian films ever made. Srinivasa Rao gave his inputs and opinion on the film's script as a part of the mentorship.

Kannada cinema
Srinivasa Rao was the executive director of the 1970 Kannada movie Samskara directed by Pattabhirama Reddy. It won the President's gold medal for National Film Award for Best Feature Film. Singeetam made his Kannada directorial debut with the 1982 blockbuster Haalu Jenu starring Rajkumar. He went on to direct six more Kannada blockbusters with Rajkumar -  Chalisuva Modagalu (1982), Eradu Nakshatragalu (1983), Shravana Banthu (1984), Jwaalamukhi (1985), Bhagyada Lakshmi Baramma (1986) and Devatha Manushya (1988). Two of these were based on novels. He was selected to direct the historical Amoghavarsha Nrupathunga which was supposed to be Rajkumar's 200th movie but eventually dropped. However, he subsequently went on to direct Devatha Manushya (1988) which happened to be Rajkumar's 200th film.

His other non-Rajkumar Kannada directorials include Anand (1986) and Chiranjeevi Sudhakara (1988) apart from Ksheera Sagara (1992),  Tuvvi Tuvvi Tuvvi (1999) and Make-up (2002) in the latter part of his career. He co-wrote the screenplay for two Kannada movies produced by Rajkumar's banner that were not directed by him - Shruthi Seridaaga (1987) and Samyuktha (1988). He was also the script-writer of Belliyappa Bangarappa (1992). A disciple of legendary composer S. Rajeswara Rao, he has composed music for two Kannada films - Bhagyada Lakshmi Baramma and Samyuktha.

Most of the films he directed in Kannada were produced by Parvathamma Rajkumar and all were critically and commercially successful. Of the seven films Srinivasa Rao directed with Rajkumar in lead roles, four movies were remade in Telugu. 
Singeetam's association with Rajkumar was a rare one where he not only directed cult classics and landmark movies but also co-wrote screenplay and composed music for movies produced by the actor even though they were not directed by him. This stands as a testimony for the faith Rajkumar had in the abilities of Rao and the admiration Srinivasa had for Rajkumar.
In 1988, when Rajkumar announced his desire to temporarily retire from acting, Singeetam decided to concentrate on Tamil movies where he mostly had Kamal Haasan in the lead roles.

The Kannada Film Journalists Association has honoured Srinivasa Rao with a Special Biography. Srinivasa Rao received three Karnataka State Film Awards   two for Best Screenplay and one for Best movie.

Lyricist and composer

He composed lyrics for films like Bhairava Dweepam (1994) and soundtracks for a few Kannada films. He edited many magazines in Telugu such as Bharati, and scripted plays like Brahma, Antya Ghattam, and Chitrārjuna. Chitrārjuna was also translated into English, and was telecasted in American Television. A disciple of legendary composer S. Rajeswara Rao, he has also composed music for two Kannada movies of matinee idol Rajkumar's banner - Bhagyada Lakshmi Baramma (which was directed by him) and Samyuktha - (which was not directed by him).

Innovative cinema 

The 1984 Telugu biographical dance film, Mayuri, which won the National Film Award – Special Mention (Feature Film), was premiered at the 1985 International Film Festival of India, has also received several state Awards, including the State Nandi Award for Best Feature Film, and Filmfare Award South for Best Direction. The film was later remade into Hindi as Naache Mayuri.

In 1988, he co-produced, scripted and directed the first Indian dialogue-less film, Pushpaka Vimana which received special mention at Shanghai Film Festival. When he was working with Rajkumar, Srinivasa Rao was introduced to Rajkumar's relative, actor Shringar Nagaraj who decided to co-produce Pushpaka Vimana. The film was listed among CNN-IBN's 'Hundred greatest Indian films of all time'.

The comedy-drama blockbuster Apoorva Sagodharargal (1989) was one of the enduring works on dwarfism in popular media. The film won the Filmfare Award for Best Film – Tamil, and was premiered at the International Film Festival of India. The Telugu crossover films like America Ammayi (1976), and America Abbayi (1987) were box office hits. The 1990 action comedy, Michael Madana Kama Rajan - a movie about quadruplets - became an instant hit at the box office.

The Telugu science fiction film Aditya 369 was one of the highest grossing Telugu films of 1991, grossing 9 crore at the box office. A sequel, entitled Aditya 999, was delayed indefinitely in July 2016. Another science fiction in Tamil, Chinna Vathiyar was also an instant hit. The 1994, folklore Bhairava Dweepam garnered the state Nandi Award for Best Direction.

The 2003 animation film, Son of Aladdin, had 1100 shots and 125 characters. The film won Special Mention in the Competition section at the 2003 International Children’s Film Festival Hyderabad, and subsequently premiered at the 37th International Film Festival of India. The 2008 animation film Ghatothkach received special mention at the Grand Finale - Children's Film Festival 2014 of the 44th International Film Festival of India.

Upcoming projects 
Srinivasa Rao plans to make a sequel to Aditya 369 in the future. He also expressed his wish to direct a pre-recorded experimental film  a musical in which he wants to use pre-recorded sequences and dialogues while shooting. He also wants to make a documentary on the making of Apoorva Sagodhararkal. He also wants to write a book on the making of Pushpaka Vimana, and his autobiography in the form of a screenplay.

Collaborators 
Srinivasa Rao is particularly noted for his collaboration with two actors - Dr. Rajkumar and Kamal Haasan - which resulted in commercially successful and critically acclaimed movies. With Kamal Haasan he made films such as Pushpaka Vimana (1987), Apoorva Sagodharargal (1990) and Michael Madana Kama Rajan (1991) among others, He also directed Kamal Haasan in his 100th film Raja Paarvai  / Amavasya Chandrudu (1981).

He directed Rajkumar in seven Kannada films in the 1980s. Notable among them are Haalu Jenu (1982), Chalisuva Modagalu (1982), Bhagyada Lakshmi Baramma (1986), and Rajkumar's 200th film Devatha Manushya (1988). He was also the first person to direct Dr. Rajkumar and all his three sons. He directed Shiva Rajkumar and Raghavendra Rajkumar in their debut movies, Anand (1986) and Chiranjeevi Sudhakara (1988) respectively. He had also directed Puneeth Rajkumar as a child artiste in Eradu Nakshatragalu in which he played dual role. Most of his Kannada films were produced by Parvathamma Rajkumar whose ability to judge what would work with the audience and whose story-picking knack he believed in. He was the only director to have worked with her on at least one film in each of the seven years during 1982 to 1988.

Srinivasa Rao also collaborated with Balakrishna in three films  the science fiction film Aditya 369 (1991), fantasy film Bhairava Dweepam (1994), and the mythological film Sri Krishnarjuna Vijayam (1996). Aditya 369 and Bhairava Dweepam are considered landmark films in science fiction and fantasy genres respectively in Telugu cinema. He directed Rajendra Prasad in two films  Brundavanam (1992) and  Madam (1994). Both were commercially successful.

Kannada actor Shivaram has been a part of all seven movies of Srinivasa Rao starring Rajkumar. B. C. Gowrishankar, a regular cameraman for Rajkumar movies, was selected as the cinematographer for Srinivasa Rao's later movies - Pushpaka Vimana  and Michael Madana Kama Rajan. Another regular technician of Rajkumar movies - art director Peketi Ranga - was also selected as the art director for Srinivasa Rao's Michael Madana Kama Rajan.

Influences 
His favourite litterateurs are Vemana, Mark Twain, and P. G. Wodehouse. He feels no one has expressed the truths of everyday life better than Vemana. He was introduced to Mark Twain by an American missionary when he was eight. He considers Robin Hood to be his favourite hero of fiction.

Accolades 
In 2010, Srinivasa Rao headed the Jury of the Indian Panorama at the 8th Chennai International Film Festival. In 2011, Srinivasa Rao received the Life Achievement Award from the Film Federation of India at the 4th Global Film Festival. Srinivasa Rao was also the Guest of honor alongside Barrie Osbourne at the Media and Entertainment Business Conclave 2012 hosted by FICCI and FFI. In 2012, Srinivasa Rao served as one of the selection committee members for the Sundance Institute's screenwriters lab.

19th Chennai International Film Festival
 Life Time Achievement Award (2021)

Film Federation of India
 Life Time Achievement Award (2011)

National Film Awards

 1973 - National Film Award for Best Feature Film in Tamil  - Dikkatra Parvathi
 1988 - National Film Award for Best Popular Film Providing Wholesome Entertainment - Pushpaka Vimana

Nandi Awards
 1985 - Best Screenplay Writer - Mayuri
 1985 - Best Director - Mayuri
 1992 - Best Screenplay Writer - Brundavanam
 1994 - Best Director - Bhairava Dweepam
 2012 - BN Reddy National Award for Life Time Achievement

Karnataka State Film Awards
 1982 - Karnataka State Film Award for First Best Film - Haalu Jenu
 1985 - Karnataka State Film Award for Best Screenplay - Bhagyada Lakshmi Baramma
 1986 - Karnataka State Film Award for Best Screenplay - Anand

Filmfare Awards South
 1974 - Filmfare Award for Best Film – Tamil -   Dikkatra Parvathi
 1985 - Filmfare Best Director Award (Telugu) -  Mayuri
 1987 - Filmfare Award for Best Director - Kannada - Pushpaka Vimana

Filmography

References

External links 
 

1931 births
Living people
Telugu people
Film directors from Andhra Pradesh
Telugu film directors
Kannada film directors
Tamil film directors
Malayalam film directors
Hindi-language film directors
Indian silent film directors
Indian animated film directors
Filmfare Awards South winners
Nandi Award winners
20th-century Indian film directors
21st-century Indian film directors
Telugu film producers
Film producers from Andhra Pradesh
Kannada screenwriters
Telugu screenwriters
Hindi screenwriters
Tamil screenwriters
20th-century Indian dramatists and playwrights
21st-century Indian dramatists and playwrights
People from Nellore district
Screenwriters from Andhra Pradesh
Silent film directors
Producers who won the Best Popular Film Providing Wholesome Entertainment National Film Award
Directors who won the Best Popular Film Providing Wholesome Entertainment National Film Award